The Guatemala national tennis team represents Guatemala in Davis Cup tennis competition and are governed by the Federación Nacional de Tenis de Guatemala.

Guatemala currently compete in the Americas Zone of Group II.  They have reached the Group II semifinals on three occasions.

History
Guatemala competed in its first Davis Cup in 1990.

Current team (2022) 

 Kaeri Hernández
 Sebastián Domínguez
 Kris Hernández
 Rafael Botrán (Junior player)

See also
Davis Cup
Guatemala Fed Cup team

External links

Davis Cup teams
Davis Cup
Davis Cup